A breakfast sandwich is any sandwich filled with foods associated with breakfast. Breakfast sandwiches are served at fast food restaurants and delicatessens, sold in supermarkets, or commonly made at home. Different types of breakfast sandwich include the bacon sandwich, the egg sandwich, and the sausage sandwich; or various combinations thereof, like the bacon, egg and cheese sandwich. The breakfast sandwich is related to the breakfast roll.

Overview

Breakfast sandwiches are typically made using breakfast meats (generally cured meats such as sausages, patty sausages, bacon, country ham, scrapple, Spam, and pork roll), breads, eggs and cheese. These sandwiches were typically regional specialties until fast food restaurants began serving breakfast. Because the common types of bread, such as biscuits, bagels, and English muffin, were similar in size to fast food hamburger buns, they made an obvious choice for fast food restaurants.  Unlike other breakfast items, they were perfect for the innovation of the drive-through.  These sandwiches have also become a staple of many convenience stores.

History
Although the ingredients for the breakfast sandwich have been common elements of breakfast meals in the English-speaking world for centuries, it was not until the 19th century in the United States that people began regularly eating eggs, cheese, and meat in a sandwich. What would later be known as "breakfast sandwiches" became increasingly popular after the American Civil War, and were a favorite food of pioneers during American westward expansion. The first known published recipe for a "breakfast sandwich" was in an 1897 American cookbook.

Types of bread used

There are several types of bread used to make breakfast sandwiches:

 Hard roll: The traditional breakfast sandwich of the northeast's tri-state region of New York, New Jersey, and Connecticut. It is believed to be one of the earliest forms of the breakfast sandwich in the United States. It consists of a hard roll, eggs, cheese and sausage, bacon or ham. In New Jersey, a common breakfast sandwich is the Jersey breakfast which consists of pork roll, egg, and cheese on a hard Kaiser roll.
 Biscuit: Consists of a large, or cat-head biscuit, sliced, on which meat, cheese, or eggs are served. Popular biscuits include: Sausage biscuit, bacon, tomato, and country ham. Fast food restaurants have put smaller versions of fried chicken fillets on biscuits to create chicken biscuits. Scrambled eggs and/or American cheese are often added.
 Bagel sandwiches: Due to its connection with German and Jewish ethnic groups, Bagels often have foods popular in these communities. Deli meats, Canadian bacon, lox or other smoked fish, and cream cheese are popular on bagel sandwiches.
 English muffin: Generally contains egg and cheese with either breakfast sausage or ham. Often served in US fast food outlets such as McDonald's and Starbucks.
 Toast: Toasted bread is one of the oldest forms of breakfast sandwich in America, and the closest to the original sandwich in form. While any number of items might be served on toast, eggs and bacon are the ones most associated with breakfast.
 Specialty breads: Mostly served by restaurant chains, there are other breakfast sandwiches that do not use one of the common breakfast breads used in the United States. Burger King uses a croissant to make a breakfast sandwich called the Croissan'wich, or croissant sandwich, depending on the market. McDonald's offers its traditional biscuit fillings on a sandwich made from maple flavored pancakes called a McGriddles. Dunkin' Donuts has a waffle sandwich that is similar to the McGriddles. These can be found at American fast food franchises worldwide. Kangaroo Brands makes a variety of breakfast sandwiches made with pita bread.

See also
 Breakfast burrito
 Breakfast roll
 Morning roll
 Bacon and egg roll

References

 
American sandwiches
Cheese sandwiches
Egg sandwiches